This is a list of flag bearers who have represented Brazil at the Olympics.

Flag bearers carry the national flag of their country at the opening ceremony of the Olympic Games.

See also
Brazil at the Olympics

References

Brazil at the Olympics
Brazil
Olympic